Black Magic; All Mysteries Revealed is the second studio album by American hard rock band Year Long Disaster. Recorded at Sound City Studios with producer Nick Raskulinecz, it was released on March 9, 2010 by Volcom Entertainment. "Show Me Your Teeth" was released as a single.

Concept and style
Black Magic; All Mysteries Revealed is said to be loosely based on the novel The Master and Margarita by Russian author Mikhail Bulgakov. Speaking in an interview, Year Long Disaster frontman Daniel Davies explained that the band was influenced by the book's themes of "good and evil, spiritual and material" when writing the songs on the album.

Reception

Media response to Black Magic; All Mysteries Revealed was mixed. Gregory Heaney of AllMusic suggested that the album is better than its predecessor, 2007's Year Long Disaster, describing its sound as "darker and heavier" than the self-titled release. Heaney noted that "the songs feel less rushed, giving them the relaxed and confident demeanor of a band that's starting to come into their own as songwriters", highlighting tracks including "Major Arcana" and "Show Me Your Teeth". Punknews.org's review of the album was less positive, claiming that the band's music "lack[s] depth"; the reviewer did, however, admit that "the band is at least good at what they do".

Track listing

Personnel

Daniel Davies – vocals, guitar
Rich Mullins – bass
Brad Hargreaves – drums, percussion
Additional personnel
Nick Raskulinecz – producer, mixer
Paul Figueroa – engineer
Adam Ayan – mastering
Sean Oakley – engineering assistance
Aaron Dahl – mixing assistance
Ted CoConis – cover artwork
Desire Pfeiffer – photography
Sophie Gransard – layout

References

2010 albums
Year Long Disaster albums
Volcom Entertainment albums
Albums recorded at Sound City Studios